Urad may refer to:

 Urad Mongols, a tribe in Inner Mongolia
 Urad, a region in Bayannur, Inner Mongolia
 Urad Front Banner
 Urad Middle Banner
 Urad Rear Banner
 Urad (bean), a bean used in Indian cuisine
 Urad, Poland